Horace Reid (born 8 May 1935) is a Jamaican cricketer. He played in four first-class matches for the Jamaican cricket team from 1961 to 1964.

See also
 List of Jamaican representative cricketers

References

External links
 

1935 births
Living people
Jamaican cricketers
Jamaica cricketers
Sportspeople from Kingston, Jamaica